The Ten Major Construction Projects were the national infrastructure projects during the 1970s in Taiwan. The government of Republic of China believed that the country lacked key utilities such as highways, seaports, airports and power plants. Moreover, Taiwan was experiencing significant effects from the 1973 oil crisis. Therefore, to upgrade the industry and the development of the country, the government planned to take on ten massive building projects. They were proposed by the Premier Chiang Ching-kuo, beginning in 1974, with a planned completion by 1979. There were six transportation projects, three industrial projects, and one power-plant construction project, which ultimately cost over NT$300 billion in total.

The Ten Projects
 North-South Freeway (National Highway No. 1)
 Electrification of West Coast Line railway
 North-Link Line railway
 Chiang Kai-shek International Airport (later renamed Taoyuan International Airport)
 Taichung Port
 Su-ao Port
 Large Shipyard (Kaohsiung Shipyard of China Shipbuilding Corporation)
 Integrated steel mill (China Steel Corporation)
 Oil refinery and industrial park (Kaohsiung refinery of CPC Corporation )
 Nuclear power plant (Jinshan Nuclear Power Plant)

See also
 New Ten Major Construction Projects
 History of Republic of China

References

Economy of Taiwan
1970s in Taiwan
Construction in Asia